The Black River is a tributary of Lake Erie, about 12 mi (19 km) long, in northern Ohio in the United States.  Via Lake Erie, the Niagara River and Lake Ontario, it is part of the watershed of the St. Lawrence River, which flows to the Atlantic Ocean.  The Black drains an area of 470 mi² (1217 km²).

According to the Geographic Names Information System, the Black River was formerly named "Canesadooharie River" and  "Riviere en Grys."  (These two historical names were actually originally intended to refer to nearby rivers, instead of the Black River.)

Course
The Black River is formed in the city of Elyria by the confluence of its east and west branches:
 The East Branch Black River is formed in northwestern Medina County by the confluence of two short tributaries, the East Fork Black River and the West Fork East Branch Black River.  The East Fork flows southwardly past Lodi before turning northwestwardly, and the West Fork rises in northeastern Ashland County and flows generally eastwardly into Medina County; the two join about 1 mi (2 km) northwest of Lodi, and the East Branch then flows generally northwardly into Lorain County, past Grafton.  It drains an area of 222 mi² (575 km²).
 The West Branch Black River, about 30 mi (48 km) long, rises in northern Ashland County and flows generally northeastwardly into Lorain County, past Rochester.  It drains an area of 174 mi² (451 km²).

The mouth of the river forms part of the harbor of Lorain.

Name and history 

In the 1700s, the Black River was known as the "Reneshoua River", and was also referred to as "la Riviere de la Cuiliere" by early French and British explorers. The origin of those names is uncertain, although "Cuilliere" was also the name of a French fur-trader who frequented the Lake Erie shore areas about 1760. This river became well known by the early European explorers, as being the safest harboring spot at the western end of "the cliffs" which extended many miles along the southern Lake Erie shore from this river almost to the Cuyahoga River's mouth, and in the 1700s these cliffs had almost no beach areas for landing even a small boat, and were too high and steep to climb.

In 1787, the Moravian missionary, David Zeisberger, led a group of Christian-converted Native-Americans from their settlement on the Cuyahoga River, to a new intended settlement probably on the Black River*, about 5 or 6 miles upstream from Lake Erie. However, after remaining only twelve days, the group was prevented from settling here due to warnings by a local Native-American tribe ( about potential dangers from the inevitable "white" settlers), and so the group instead relocated to the Huron River, in (now) Milan, Ohio. (*-Zeisberger did not specifically record the name of the river of their brief stay, but merely that it was "halfway between" the Cuyahoga and Huron Rivers.)

The Black River has two impressive falls in the city of Elyria Ohio, these falls having been the reason that nineteenth-century historians concluded that the Black River was the "Canesadooharie," the river upon which James Smith encamped with Native Americans, in 1755 and 1756. There exists some speculation that the river Smith referred to was the Huron River. Its Native-American name was phonetically interpreted by other European explorers as "Guahadahuri." The only original source for the word "Canesadooharie" was Col. James Smith (captured by Native-Americans and brought to live among them near Sandusky Bay), who had written about his visit to the "falls" on the river "Canesadooharie." Historians have guessed that the falls of which Smith spoke might have been the same falls in the (now) city of Elyria.  Subsequently, other historians surmised that the very word "Canesadooharie" might translate to "black pearl," or even more romantically to "string of black pearls," apparently giving further credence to the notion that the "Canesadooharie" referred to the Black River. Inconsistencies in Smith's account raise some questions. The single "falls" Smith describes were "12 to 15 feet high, and nearly perpendicular". However, both of the  individual falls near the City of Elyria are much larger—about 40 feet in height and absolutely perpendicular. These two Black River falls are very near one another, within easy walking distance, and any person spending several weeks fishing and hunting in the area, as Smith did, would not likely have overlooked the other falls here. The single falls which Smith experienced over a period of many weeks may have been merely very steep rapids somewhere in the vicinity of (now) Milan, Ohio, but time and nature could have altered them beyond recognition, even by the mid-1800s. Nevertheless, in the original edition of Smith's account, he notes that the "Canesadooharie" was "about 8 miles east of Sandusky or betwixt Sandusky and Cayahaga (the Cuyahoga River); the Black River is approximately midway between the Sandusky and the Cuyahoga. Smith also notes that the Canesadooharie "interlocks with the West Branch of the Muskingum." Potentially, this could refer to the relatively short portage between the Huron River and the Black Fork of the Mohican River, which connects into the Muskingum. Just as likely, Smith could be referring to the even shorter portage between the Black River and Killbuck Creek.

"Riviere en Grys" (another GNIS name for the Black River) was instead originally the name of now Beaver Creek, several miles west of the Black River.

See also

List of rivers of Ohio

References

Rivers of Ohio
Rivers of Ashland County, Ohio
Rivers of Lorain County, Ohio
Rivers of Medina County, Ohio
Tributaries of Lake Erie